Polycyrtus is a genus of ichneumon wasps in the subfamily Cryptinae. There are more than 160 species of Polycyrtus, found in the Americas.

See also
 List of Polycyrtus species

References

External links 

 
 Polycyrtus at insectoid.info

Cryptinae
Ichneumonidae genera